Dirk Alvermann (born 1965) is a German historian and archivist.

Early life and education

Born in Berlin, Alvermann is a son of the photographer Dirk Alvermann. From 1988 he studied archive science and history at the Humboldt-Universität zu Berlin and the Sapienza University of Rome. In 1993 he took his master's degree in Berlin. Alvermann was a scholarship holder of the German Historical Institute in Rome in 1994.

Career

Posts

Since 2011 he has been a member of the board of directors of the society

Research

Alvermann's research focuses on medieval diplomatics, archival studies, history of Pomerania and university history. 

In his dissertation, Alvermann used the methods of itinerary analysis of Müller-Merten's "Reichtsstruktur und Herrschaftspraxis Otto II". He not only concentrated on the northern alpine region, but also included Italy in his analysis. Alvermann concluded that "the structural characteristics of the early medieval East Franconian German Empire, which Müller-Mertens described on the basis of Otto I's itinerarium, are also confirmed for Otto II's reign". However, there are "partial discontinuities with regard to the structure of the empire and the practice of rule". Thus, under Otto II, all of Thuringia became a close zone of royal rule. The two southern German duchies Bavaria and Swabia remained also under Otto II's far zones of the royal rule. Otto II visited the "political central areas" in the north, especially during the high church festivals. Italy was a "development and construction phase" both for Otto I's reign and for his son. The presence in Salerno is "perhaps the most striking sign of an intensification of rule in the Lombard south" under Otto II. Together with the historian Nils Jörn, Alvermann is editor of the Biographisches Lexikon für Pommern.

Publications 
Monographs
 Königsherrschaft und Reichsintegration. Eine Untersuchung zur politischen Struktur von regna und imperium zur Zeit Kaiser Ottos II. (967) 973–983 (Berliner historische Studien. Vol. 28). Duncker und Humblot, Berlin 1998,  (At the same time: Berlin, Humboldt-Universität, dissertation, 1995).

Editorial boards
 ... die letzten Schranken fallen lassen. Studien zur Universität Greifswald im Nationalsozialismus. Böhlau, Cologne among others. 2015, }.
 with : Quellen zur Verfassungsgeschichte der Universität Greifswald. (Beiträge zur Geschichte der Universität Greifswald. vol. 10, 1–3). 3 volumes. Steiner, Stuttgart 2011–2014;
 Volume 1: Benjamin Müsegades, Sabine-Maria Weitzel: Von der Universitätsgründung bis zum Westfälischen Frieden. 1456–1648. 2011, ;
 Volume 2: Marco Pohlmann-Linke, Sabine-Maria Weitzel: Die schwedische Großmachtzeit bis zum Ende des Großen Nordischen Krieges 1649–1720. 2012, ;
 Volume 3: Sabine-Maria Weitzel, Marco Pohlmann-Linke: Von der Freiheitszeit bis zum Übergang an Preußen 1721–1815. 2014, .
 with Irmfried Garbe: Ernst Moritz Arndt. Anstöße und Wirkungen (= Veröffentlichungen der Historischen Kommission für Pommern. 5th series: Forschungen zur Pommerschen Geschichte. Vol. 46). Böhlau, Cologne among others 2011, .
 with Karl-Heinz Spieß: Bausteine zur Greifswalder Universitätsgeschichte. Vorträge anlässlich des Jubiläums „550 Jahre Universität Greifswald“ (Beiträge zur Geschichte der Universität Greifswald. Vol. 8). Steiner, Stuttgart 2008, .
 with Nils Jörn and Jens E. Olesen: Die Universität Greifswald in der Bildungslandschaft des Ostseeraums (Nordische Geschichte. Vol. 5). Lit, Berlin among others 2007, .
 with Irmfried Garbe and Manfred Herling: Gerhardt Katsch: Greifswalder Tagebuch 1946–47. Ludwig, Kiel 2007,  (several editions).
 with Birgit Dahlenburg: Greifswalder Köpfe. Gelehrtenporträts und Lebensbilder des 16.–18. Jahrhunderts aus der pommerschen Landesuniversität. Hinstorff, Rostock 2006,  (Review).

External links 
 
 Veröffentlichungen von Dirk Alvermann im Opac der 
 Autoreninformation beim Lukas Verlag
 Seite von Alvermann am Universitätsarchiv Greifswald

References 

German archivists
20th-century German historians
21st-century German historians
1965 births
Living people
Writers from Berlin